Keishi (written: 啓志, 啓示, 啓視 or 圭志) is a masculine Japanese given name. Notable people with the name include:

, a pen name of author Takashi Nagasaki
Keishi Kameyama, Japanese businessman
, Japanese sumo wrestler
, Japanese footballer
, Japanese baseball player

Japanese masculine given names